Macrobrachium rosenbergii, also known as the giant river prawn or giant freshwater prawn, is a commercially important species of palaemonid freshwater prawn. It is found throughout the tropical and subtropical areas of the Indo-Pacific region, from India to Southeast Asia and Northern Australia. The giant freshwater prawn has also been introduced to parts of Africa, Thailand, China, Japan, New Zealand, the Americas, and the Caribbean. It is one of the biggest freshwater prawns in the world, and is widely cultivated in several countries for food. While M. rosenbergii is considered a freshwater species, the larval stage of the animal depends on brackish water. Once the individual shrimp has grown beyond the planktonic stage and becomes a juvenile, it lives entirely in fresh water.

It is also known as the Malaysian prawn, freshwater scampi (India), or cherabin (Australia).

Description

They are predominantly brownish in colour, but can vary. Smaller individuals may be greenish and display faint vertical stripes. The rostrum is very prominent and contains 11 to 14 dorsal teeth and 8 to 11 ventral teeth. The first pair of walking legs (pereiopods) is elongated and very thin, ending in delicate claws (chelipeds), which are used as feeding appendages. The second pair of walking legs are much larger and powerful, especially in males. The movable claws of the second pair of walking legs are distinctively covered in dense bristles (setae) that give them a velvety appearance. The color of the claws in males varies according to their social dominance.

Females can be distinguished from males by their wider abdomens  and smaller second pereiopods. The genital openings are found on the body segments containing the fifth pereiopods and the third pereiopods in males and females, respectively.

Morphotypes
Three different morphotypes of males exist. The first stage is called "small male" (SM); this smallest stage has short, nearly translucent claws. If conditions allow, small males grow and metamorphose into "orange claws" (OC), which have large orange claws on their second chelipeds, which may have a length of 0.8 to 1.4 times their body size. OC males later may transform into the third and final stage, the "blue claw" (BC) males. These have blue claws, and their second chelipeds may become twice as long as their bodies.

Males of  M. rosenbergii have a strict hierarchy; the territorial BC males dominate the OCs, which in turn dominate the SMs. The presence of BC males inhibits the growth of SMs and delays the metamorphosis of OCs into BCs; an OC keeps growing until it is larger than the largest BC male in its neighbourhood before transforming. All three male stages are sexually active, and females that have undergone their premating moult  co-operate with any male to reproduce. BC males protect the females until their shells have hardened; OCs and SMs show no such behaviour.

Lifecycle
In mating, the male deposits spermatophores on the underside of the female's thorax, between the walking legs. The female then extrudes eggs, which pass through the spermatophores. The female carries the fertilised eggs with her until they hatch; the time may vary, but is generally less than 3 weeks. Females lay 10,000–50,000 eggs up to five times per year.

From these eggs hatch zoeae, the first larval stage of crustaceans. This metamorphosis usually takes place about 32 to 35 days after hatching. These postlarvae then migrate back into fresh water.

References

External links
 How to Know Gender of Macrobrachium rosenbergii.
 Macrobrachium rosenbergii diet.
 Prove Macrobrachium rosenbergii can upsize in wild.
 How to cath Macrobrachium rosenbergii.
 FAO Fisheries & Aquaculture: Macrobrachium rosenbergii
 Aquaculture of Texas
 
 

Palaemonidae
Edible crustaceans
Commercial crustaceans
Freshwater crustaceans of Asia
Crustaceans described in 1879
Taxa named by Johannes Govertus de Man